Aupaluktok Island is an uninhabited island in the Qikiqtaaluk Region of Nunavut, Canada. It is one of the two main Sanigut Islands, stretching between Avataktoo Bay to the north and the Cumberland Sound to the south, off Baffin Island's Cumberland Peninsula. Akulagok Island, Anarnittuq Island, Beacon Island, Imigen Island, Ivisa Island, Kekertelung Island, Saunik Island, Tesseralik Island, Tuapait Island, and Ugpitimik Island are in the vicinity.

References

External links 
 Aupaluktok Island in the Atlas of Canada - Toporama; Natural Resources Canada

Islands of Baffin Island
Islands of Cumberland Sound
Uninhabited islands of Qikiqtaaluk Region